Neoplocaederus is a genus of beetle belonging to the family Cerambycidae.

List of species
 Neoplocaederus atlanticus (Rungs, 1952)
 Neoplocaederus basalis (Gahan, 1890)
 Neoplocaederus bennigseni (Kolbe, 1897)
 Neoplocaederus bicolor (Gressitt, 1942)
 Neoplocaederus bruncki (Villiers, 1969)
 Neoplocaederus caroli (Leprieur, 1876)
 Neoplocaederus chloropterus (Chevrolat, 1856)
 Neoplocaederus cineraceus (Fairmaire, 1882)
 Neoplocaederus conradti (Kolbe, 1893)
 Neoplocaederus consocius (Pascoe, 1859)
 Neoplocaederus cyanipennis (J. Thomson, 1860)
 Neoplocaederus danilevskyi Lazarev, 2009
 Neoplocaederus elongatulus (Holzschuh, 1993)
 Neoplocaederus emini (Waterhouse, 1890)
 Neoplocaederus ferrugineus (Linnaeus, 1792)
 Neoplocaederus formosus (Harold, 1878)
 Neoplocaederus francqueni (Lepesme & Breuning, 1950)
 Neoplocaederus frenatus (Fåhraeus, 1872)
 Neoplocaederus fucatus (Thomson, 1858)
 Neoplocaederus gabonicus (Gahan, 1890)
 Neoplocaederus glabricollis (Hope, 1843)
 Neoplocaederus granulatus (Aurivillius, 1909)
 Neoplocaederus incertus (Gestro, 1892)
 Neoplocaederus luristanicus (Holzschuh, 1977)
 Neoplocaederus melancholicus (Gahan, 1890)
 Neoplocaederus nitidipennis (Chevrolat, 1858)
 Neoplocaederus obesus (Gahan, 1890)
 Neoplocaederus opalinus (Atkinson, 1953)
 Neoplocaederus pedestris (White, 1853)
 Neoplocaederus purpuripennis (Gahan, 1890)
 Neoplocaederus ruficornis (Newman, 1842)
 Neoplocaederus scapularis (Fischer von Waldheim, 1821)
 Neoplocaederus spinicornis (Fabricius, 1781)
 Neoplocaederus vadoni (Villiers, 1969)
 Neoplocaederus vicinus (Villiers, 1969)
 Neoplocaederus viridescens (Atkinson, 1953)
 Neoplocaederus viridipennis (Hope, 1843)

References
 Biolib
 Zipcodezoo
 F. Vitali  Cerambycoidea

Cerambycini